Secret of the Sands is a historical novel written by Scottish writer Sara Sheridan. The book was first published by HarperCollins in 2011. It is set in 1833 and has themes of colonialism and slavery.

Plot summary 
The novel is set in 1833, during a British naval survey of the coastline of the Arabian Peninsula. An ambitious Lieutenant James Wellstead's plans are thrown into disarray when two of his shipmates, Jones and Jessop, go missing in the desert while gathering intelligence and he has to carry out a daring rescue.

Slavery is still rife throughout Arabia. Zena, a headstrong Abyssinian beauty who was torn from her village, is now being offered for sale as a slave in the market of Muscat. However, her fortunes change when she finds herself in the company of the lieutenant. She must accompany him on his hazardous mission, forced to make big choices, and little knowing the fate that awaits them.

Setting 
Secret of the Sands is set in the historical world of 1833 on the Arabian Peninsula.

References 

Scottish novels
2011 British novels
Fiction set in 1833
Novels set in the 1830s
History of Muscat, Oman
HarperCollins books